Marius Kusch (born 5 May 1993) is a German swimmer. He competed in the men's 100 metre butterfly event at the 2017 World Aquatics Championships. He qualified to represent Germany at the 2020 Summer Olympics.

References

External links

1993 births
Living people
German male swimmers
Place of birth missing (living people)
German male butterfly swimmers
European Aquatics Championships medalists in swimming
Swimmers at the 2020 Summer Olympics
Olympic swimmers of Germany
Queens University of Charlotte alumni
20th-century German people
21st-century German people